Bowmanella pacifica  is a bacterium from the genus of Bowmanella which has been isolated from sediments from the Pacific Ocean. Bowmanella pacifica degrades pyrene.

References

External links
Type strain of Bowmanella pacifica at BacDive -  the Bacterial Diversity Metadatabase

Alteromonadales
Bacteria described in 2009